Fabio Rosati is an Italian-born executive who served as a CEO of online work marketplace platforms Elance and Upwork, and as Chairman of hourly work marketplace Snagajob. Rosati is a contributor to online work, the freelance economy, and real-time hiring.

Education and career

Originally from Florence, Italy, attended Georgetown University. Rosati joined Gemini Consulting (a division of Capgemini) in its early days and left a decade later to join a Silicon Valley start-up, Elance, as Chief Executive Officer. In 2006 Elance sold its enterprise software business to focus on a new platform where businesses and freelance talent could connect and collaborate with each other online. Among the largest and fastest-growing companies in the online work industry, Elance allowed businesses to find, hire, manage and pay freelancers. In 2013, Elance had over 3 million users, and over $300 million in annual billings. In December 2013, as Elance and oDesk announced their merger, Rosati was named CEO of Elance-oDesk. In April 2015, with more than 13 million users and $1B in annual billings, Elance-oDesk introduced a unified platform and a new name, Upwork. Rosati served on Upwork's board of directors until 2017 and currently serves on the board of directors at Snagajob and Xometry.

References

External links
 

American businesspeople
Living people
American management consultants
Italian emigrants to the United States
Georgetown University alumni
Year of birth missing (living people)
Businesspeople from Florence